The district of Bautzen is a district in the state of Saxony in Germany. Its largest towns are Bautzen, Bischofswerda, Kamenz, Hoyerswerda and Radeberg. It is the biggest district in Saxony by area, and a member of the Neisse Euroregion.

It is bordered to the south by the Czech Republic. Clockwise, it also borders the district of Sächsische Schweiz-Osterzgebirge, the district-free city of Dresden, the district of Meißen, the state of Brandenburg, and the Görlitz district.

History 

Historically, most of Upper Lusatia belonged to Bohemia. After the end of the Thirty Years' War, it became a part of Saxony. Only the small town of Schirgiswalde remained Bohemian until 1809.

The district was established in 1994 by merging the former districts of Bautzen and Bischofswerda. The district of Kamenz and the district-free city of Hoyerswerda were merged into the district in August 2008.

Geography
The district of Bautzen is part of the region of Upper Lusatia (Oberlausitz). The south of the district is occupied by the Lusatian Mountains, and the countryside slopes away to the north.

The Spree river enters the district from the southeast and runs through Schirgiswalde and Bautzen before leaving to the north. North of Bautzen, the river is dammed by a reservoir (Talsperre Bautzen, 5.5 km²).

At its widest, the district is 65 km east–west, and 63 km north–south.

Towns and municipalities 

{|
! align="left" | Towns
! align="left" | Municipalities
!
|- valign="top"
|
Bautzen (Budyšin)
Bernsdorf (Njedźichow)
Bischofswerda (Biskupicy)
Elstra (Halštrow)
Großröhrsdorf
Hoyerswerda (Wojerecy)
Kamenz (Kamjenc)
Königsbrück (Kinspork)
Lauta (Łuty)
Pulsnitz (Połčnica)
Radeberg
Schirgiswalde-Kirschau
Weißenberg (Wospork)
Wilthen Wjelećin)
Wittichenau (Kulow)
||
 Arnsdorf
 Burkau (Porchow)
 Crostwitz (Chrósćicy)
 Cunewalde (Kumwałd)
 Demitz-Thumitz (Zemicy-Tumicy)
 Doberschau-Gaußig (Dobruša-Huska)
 Elsterheide (Halštrowska hola)
 Frankenthal
 Göda (Hodźij)
 Großdubrau (Wulka Dubrawa)
 Großharthau
 Großnaundorf
 Großpostwitz (Budestecy)
 Haselbachtal
||
 Laußnitz (Łužnica)
 Hochkirch (Bukecy)
 Lichtenberg
 Königswartha (Rakecy)
 Kubschütz (Kubšicy)
 Lohsa (Łaz)
 Malschwitz (Malešecy)
 Nebelschütz (Njebjelćicy)
 Neschwitz (Njeswaćidło)
 Neukirch/Lausitz (Wjazońca)
 Neukirch (bei Königsbrück)
 Obergurig (Hornja Hórka)
 Ohorn
 Oßling (Wóslink)
||
  Puschwitz (Bóšicy)
 Ottendorf-Okrilla
 Panschwitz-Kuckau (Pančicy-Kukow)
 Räckelwitz (Worklecy)
 Radibor (Radwor)
 Ralbitz-Rosenthal (Ralbicy-Róžant)
 Rammenau (Ramnow)
 Schmölln-Putzkau (Smělna-Póckowy)
 Schwepnitz (Sepicy)
 Sohland an der Spree (Załom')
 Spreetal (Sprjewiny doł'')
 Steina
 Steinigtwolmsdorf
 Wachau
|}

Coat of arms 
The district's arms are identical to the arms of the margravate of Upper Lusatia. The coat of arms was established about 1350, when six towns of Upper Lusatia founded a confederacy. This loose alliance became a margravate under the Bohemian crown in 1378.

References

External links

Official website (German)

 
Districts of Saxony
Geography of Lusatia